This is the list of number-one hits on the ARIA Club Chart in 2010, compiled by the Australian Recording Industry Association (ARIA) from weekly DJ reports.

2010

Number-one artists

See also
ARIA Charts
List of number-one singles of 2010 (Australia)
List of number-one albums of 2010 (Australia)
2010 in music

References

2010 Club
Australia Club Chart
2010 in Australian music